The Flyweight class in the 1st AIBA African Olympic Boxing Qualifying Tournament competition was the lightest class.  Flyweights were limited to those boxers weighing between 48 - 51 kilograms.

List of boxers

Medalists

Results

Preliminary round

Quarterfinal Round

Semifinal Round

3rd place Round

Final Round

Qualification to Olympic games

References
AIBA

AIBA African 2008 Olympic Qualifying Tournament